Affirmative action involves sets of policies and practices within a government or organization seeking to include particular groups based on their gender, race, sexuality, creed or nationality in areas in which such groups are underrepresented — such as education and employment. Historically and internationally, support for affirmative action has sought to achieve goals such as bridging inequalities in employment and pay, increasing access to education, promoting diversity, and redressing apparent past wrongs, harms, or hindrances.

The nature of affirmative-action policies varies from region to region and exists on a spectrum from a hard quota to merely targeting encouragement for increased participation. Some countries use a quota system, reserving a certain percentage of government jobs, political positions, and school vacancies for members of a certain group; an example of this is the reservation system in India.

In some other jurisdictions where quotas are not used, minority-group members are given preference or special consideration in selection processes. In the United States, affirmative action in employment and education has been the subject of legal and political controversy. In 2003, the Supreme Court of the United States, in Grutter v. Bollinger, held that the University of Michigan Law School could consider race as a plus-factor when evaluating applicants holistically and maintained the prohibition on the use of quotas.

In the United Kingdom, hiring someone simply because of their protected-group status, without regard to their performance, is illegal. However, the law in the United Kingdom does allow for membership in a protected and disadvantaged group to be considered in hiring and promotion when the group is under-represented in a given area and if the candidates are of equal merit (in which case membership in a disadvantaged group can become a "tie-breaker"). An alternative approach, common in the United Kingdom and elsewhere in Europe, is positive action. Under this approach, the focus tends to be on ensuring equal opportunity and, for example, targeted advertising campaigns to encourage ethnic minority candidates to join police forces. This is often described as being "color blind", although the social viability of that concept is heavily contested by certain elements in the United States.

In the United States, affirmative action is controversial and public opinion on the subject is divided. Supporters of affirmative action argue that it promotes equality and representation for groups which are socio-economically disadvantaged or have faced historical discrimination or oppression. Opponents of affirmative action have argued that it is a form of reverse discrimination, that it tends to benefit the most privileged within minority groups at the expense of the least fortunate within majority groups, or that—when applied to universities—it can hinder minority students by placing them in courses too difficult for them.

Origins
The term "affirmative action" was first used in the United States in "Executive Order No. 10925", signed by President John F. Kennedy on 6 March 1961, which included a provision that government contractors "take affirmative action to ensure that applicants are employed, and employees are treated [fairly] during employment, without regard to their race, creed, color, or national origin". It was used to promote actions that achieve non-discrimination. In 1965, President Lyndon B. Johnson issued Executive Order 11246 which required government employers to "hire without regard to race, religion and national origin" and "take affirmative action to ensure that applicants are employed and that employees are treated during employment, without regard to their race, color, religion, sex or national origin."

In 1968, gender was added to the anti-discrimination list.

Affirmative action is intended to promote the opportunities of defined minority groups within a society to give them equal access to that of the majority population.

It is often instituted for government and educational settings to ensure that certain designated groups within a society are able to participate in all provided opportunities including promotional, educational, and training opportunities.

The stated justification for affirmative action by its proponents is to help compensate for past discrimination, persecution or exploitation by the ruling class of a culture, and to address existing discrimination.

Methods of implementation
 Quotas
 Marketing/advertising to groups that the affirmative action is intended to increase
 Specific training or emulation actions for identified audiences
 Relaxation of selection criteria applied to a target audience

Women

Several different studies investigated the effect of affirmative action on women. Kurtulus (2012) in her review of affirmative action and the occupational advancement of minorities and women during 1973–2003 showed that the effect of affirmative action on advancing black, Hispanic, and white women into management, professional, and technical occupations occurred primarily during the 1970s and early 1980s. During this period, contractors grew their shares of these groups more rapidly than non-contractors because of the implementation of affirmative action. But the positive effect of affirmative action vanished entirely in the late 1980s, which Kurtulus says may be due to the slowdown into advanced occupation for women and minorities because of the political shift of affirmative action that started by President Reagan. Becoming a federal contractor increased white women's share of professional occupations by 0.183 percentage points, or 9.3 percent, on average during these three decades, and increased black women's share by 0.052 percentage points (or by 3.9 percent). Becoming a federal contractor also increased Hispanic women's and black men's share of technical occupations on average by 0.058 percent and 0.109 percentage points respectively (or by 7.7 and 4.2 percent). These represent a substantial contribution of affirmative action to overall trends in the occupational advancement of women and minorities over the three decades under the study. A reanalysis of multiple scholarly studies, especially in Asia, considered the impact of four primary factors on support for affirmative action programs for women: gender; political factors; psychological factors; and social structure. Kim and Kim (2014) found that, "Affirmative action both corrects existing unfair treatment and gives women equal opportunity in the future."

Quotas
Law regarding quotas and affirmative action varies widely from nation to nation.

Caste-based and other group-based quotas are used in the reservation system.

In 2012, the European Union Commission approved a plan for women to constitute 40% of non-executive board directorships in large listed companies in Europe by 2020.

In Sweden, the Supreme Court has ruled that "affirmative action" ethnic quotas in universities are discrimination and hence unlawful.  It said that the requirements for the intake should be the same for all.  The justice minister said that the decision left no room for uncertainty.

National approaches

In some countries that have laws on racial equality, affirmative action is rendered illegal because it does not treat all races equally. This approach of equal treatment is sometimes described as being "color blind", in hopes that it is effective against discrimination without engaging in reverse discrimination.

In such countries, the focus tends to be on ensuring equal opportunity and, for example, targeted advertising campaigns to encourage ethnic minority candidates to join the police force. This is sometimes called positive action.

Africa

South Africa

Apartheid
The apartheid government, as a matter of state policy, favoured white-owned, especially Afrikaner-owned companies. The aforementioned policies achieved the desired results, but in the process, they marginalised and excluded black people. Skilled jobs were also reserved for white people, and blacks were largely used as unskilled labour, enforced by legislation including the Mines and Works Act, the Job Reservations Act, the Native Building Workers Act, the Apprenticeship Act and the Bantu Education Act, creating and extending the "colour bar" in South African labour. Then the whites successfully persuaded the government to enact laws that highly restricted the blacks' employment opportunities.

Since the 1960s the apartheid laws had been weakened. Consequently, from 1975 to 1990 the real wages of black manufacturing workers rose by 50%, while those of whites rose by 1%.

The variation in skills and productivity between groups of people ultimately caused disparities in employment, occupation and income within labour markets, which provided advantages to certain groups and characteristics of people. This in due course was the motivation to introduce affirmative action in South Africa, following the end of apartheid.

Post-apartheid – the Employment Equity Act
Following the transition to democracy in 1994, the African National Congress-led government chose to implement affirmative action legislation to correct previous imbalances (a policy known as employment equity). As such, all employers were compelled by law to employ previously disenfranchised groups (blacks, Indians, and Coloureds). A related, but distinct concept is Black Economic Empowerment.

The Employment Equity Act and the Broad Based Black Economic Empowerment Act aim to promote and achieve equality in the workplace (in South Africa termed "equity"), by advancing people from designated groups. The designated groups who are to be advanced include all people of colour, women (including white women) and people with disabilities (including white people). Employment Equity legislation requires companies employing more than 50 people to design and implement plans to improve the representativity of workforce demographics, and report them to the Department of Labour.

Employment Equity also forms part of a company's Black Economic Empowerment scorecard: in a relatively complex scoring system, which allows for some flexibility in the manner in which each company meets its legal commitments, each company is required to meet minimum requirements in terms of representation by previously disadvantaged groups. The matters covered include equity ownership, representation at employee and management level (up to the board of director level), procurement from black-owned businesses and social investment programs, amongst others.

The policies of Employment Equity and, particularly, Black Economic empowerment have been criticised both by those who view them as discriminatory against white people, and by those who view them as ineffectual.

These laws cause disproportionally high costs for small companies and reduce economic growth and employment. The laws may give the black middle-class some advantage but can make the worse-off blacks even poorer. Moreover, the Supreme Court has ruled that in principle blacks may be favored, but in practice this should not lead to unfair discrimination against the others.

Affirmative action purpose
Affirmative action was introduced through the Employment Equality Act, 55 in 1998, 4 years after the end of apartheid. This act was passed to promote the constitutional right of equality and exercise true democracy. This idea was to eliminate unfair discrimination in employment, to ensure the implementation of employment equity to redress the effects of discrimination, to achieve a diverse workforce broadly representative of our people, to promote economic development and efficiency in the workforce and to give effects to the obligations of the Republic as a member of the International Labour Organisation.

Many embraced the act; however some concluded that the act contradicted itself.  The act eliminates unfair discrimination in certain sectors of the national labour market by imposing similar constraints on another.

With the introduction of Affirmative Action, black economic empowerment (BEE) rose further in South Africa.  The BEE was not a moral initiative to redress the wrongs of the past but to promote growth and strategies that aim to realize a country's full potential.  The idea was targeting the weakest link in economics, which was inequality and which would help develop the economy.  This is evident in the statement by the Department of Trade and Industry, "As such, this strategy stresses a BEE process that is associated with growth, development and enterprise development, and not merely the redistribution of existing wealth".  Similarities between the BEE and affirmative action are apparent; however there is a difference.  BEE focuses more on employment equality rather than taking wealth away from the skilled white labourers.

The main goal of affirmative action is for the country to reach its full potential.  This would result in a completely diverse workforce in economic and social sectors, thus broadening the economic base and stimulating economic growth.

Outcomes

Once applied within the country, many different outcomes arose, some positive and some negative. This depended on the approach to and the view of The Employment Equality Act and affirmative action.

Positive:
Pre-Democracy, the apartheid governments discriminated against non-white races, so with affirmative action, the country started to redress past discriminations. Affirmative action also focused on combating structural racism and racial inequality, hoping to maximize diversity in all levels of society and sectors. Achieving this would elevate the status of the perpetual underclass and to restore equal access to the benefits of society.

Negative:
As with all policies, there have also been negative outcomes. A quota system was implemented, which aimed to achieve targets of diversity in a workforce. This target affected the hiring and level of skills in the workforce, ultimately impacting the free market. Affirmative action created marginalization for coloured and Indian races in South Africa, as well as developing and aiding the middle and elite classes, leaving the lower class behind. This created a bigger gap between the lower and middle class, which led to class struggles and a greater segregation. Entitlement began to arise with the growth of the middle and elite classes, as well as race entitlement. Some assert that affirmative action is discrimination in reverse. Negative consequences of affirmative action, specifically the quota system, drove skilled labour away, resulting in bad economic growth. This is due to very few international companies wanting to invest in South Africa. As a result of the outcomes of affirmative action, the concept is continually evolving.

South African jurist Martin van Staden argues that the way affirmative action and transformation policies have been implemented in South Africa has eroded state institutions, grown corruption, and undermined the rule of law in the country.

Asia

China

There is affirmative action in education for minority nationalities. This may equate to lowering minimum requirements for the National University Entrance Examination, which is a mandatory exam for all students to enter university. Some universities set quotas for minority (non-Han) student intake. Further, minority students enrolled in ethnic minority-oriented specialties (e.g. language and literature programs) are provided with scholarships and/or pay no tuition, and are granted a monthly stipend.

Israel
A class-based affirmative action policy was incorporated into the admission practices of the four most selective universities in Israel during the early to mid-2000s. In evaluating the eligibility of applicants, neither their financial status nor their national or ethnic origins are considered. The emphasis, rather, is on structural disadvantages, especially neighborhood socioeconomic status and high school rigor, although several individual hardships are also weighed. This policy made the four institutions, especially the echelons at the most selective departments, more diverse than they otherwise would have been. The rise in geographic, economic and demographic diversity of a student population suggests that the plan's focus on structural determinants of disadvantage yields broad diversity dividends.

Israeli citizens who are women, Arabs, Blacks or people with disabilities are supported by affirmative action in the civil service employment. Also Israeli citizens who are Arabs, Blacks or people with disabilities are entitled to full university scholarships by the state.

In her study of gender politics in Israel, Dafna Izraeli showed that the paradox of affirmative action for women directors is that the legitimation for legislating their inclusion on boards also resulted in the exclusion of women's interested as a legitimate issue on the boards' agendas. "The new culture of the men's club is seductive token women are under the pressure to become "social males" and prove that their competence as directors, meaning that they are not significantly different from men. In the negotiation for status as worthy peers, emphasizing gender signals that a woman is an "imposter", someone who does not rightfully belong in the position she is claiming to fill." And once affirmative action for women is fulfilled, and then affirmative action shares the element, as Izraeli put it, the "group equality discourse," making it easier for other groups to claim for a fairer distribution of resources. This suggests that affirmative action can have applications for different groups in Israel.

India

Reservation in India is a form of affirmative action designed to improve the well-being of Scheduled Castes and Scheduled Tribes (SC/ST), and Other Backward Classes (OBC), defined primarily by their caste. Members of these categories comprise about two-thirds of the population of India. According to the Constitution of India, up to 50% of all government-run higher education admissions and government job vacancies may be reserved for members of the SC/ST/OBC-NCL categories, and 10% for those in Economically Weaker Sections (EWS), with the remaining unreserved. In 2014, the Indian National Sample Survey found that 12% of surveyed Indian households had received academic scholarships, with 94% being on account of SC/ST/OBC membership, 2% based on financial weakness and 0.7% based on merit.

Indonesia 
Indonesia has offered affirmative action for native Papuans in education, government civil worker selection, and police & army selection. After the 2019 Papua protests, many Papuan students chose to abandon their scholarship and return to their respective provinces. The program has been subject to criticism, with complaints made towards a lack of sufficient quotas and alleged corruption. Prabowo Subianto, Indonesian defense minister, has expressed that he will direct more effort towards recruiting Papuans to the Indonesian National Armed Forces. Education scholarship by Ministry of Education and Culture, called ADik to the native Papuans and students from perhipery regions close to Indonesian border.

Malaysia 

The Malaysian New Economic Policy or NEP is a form of ethnicity-based affirmative action. Malaysia provides affirmative action to those that are deemed "Bumiputera", which includes the Malay population, Orang Asli, and the indigenous people of Sabah and Sarawak, who together form a majority of the population. However, the indigenous people of Malaysia (Orang Asli) do not have the same special rights of the rest of the Bumiputera as granted under Article 153, as the Orang Asli are not referenced within the article 153 itself.

The historical/common argument is that the Malays have lower incomes than the Chinese and Indians, who have traditionally been involved in businesses and industries, who were also general migrant workers. Malaysia is a multi-ethnic country, with Malays making up the majority of close to 52% of the population. About 23% of the population is of Chinese descent, while those of Indian descent comprise about 7% of the population.

The Malaysian New Economic Policy (NEP) has been dubbed a failure as of recent years, as evidence has pointed to the ever-growing wealth disparity among Malays, that have widened the gap between the rich and poor Malays, while the Malaysian New Economic Policy has been shown to benefit the existing rich Malays instead of achieving its intention of helping poor Malays.

(See also Bumiputra) The mean income for Malays, Chinese and Indians in 1957/58 were 134, 288 and 228 respectively. In 1967/68 it was 154, 329 and 245, and in 1970 it was 170, 390 and 300. Mean income disparity ratio for Chinese/Malays rose from 2.1 in 1957/58 to 2.3 in 1970, whereas for Indians/Malays the disparity ratio also rose from 1.7 to 1.8 in the same period.

Sri Lanka 
In 1981 the Standardization policy of Sri Lankan universities was introduced as an affirmative action program for students from areas which had lower rates of education than other areas due to missionary activity in the north and east, which essentially were the Tamil areas. Successive governments cultivated a historical myth after the colonial powers had left that the British had practised communal favouritism towards Christians and the minority Tamil community for the entire 200 years they had controlled Sri Lanka. However, the Sinhalese in fact benefitted from trade and plantation cultivations over the rest of the other groups and their language and culture as well as the religion of Buddhism was fostered and made into mediums for schools over the Tamil language, which did not have the same treatment and Tamils learned English instead as there was no medium for Tamil until near independence. Tamils' knowledge of English and education came from the very American missionary activity by overseas Christians that the British were concerned will anger the Sinhalese and destroy their trading relationships, so they sent them to the Tamil areas instead to teach, thinking it would have no consequences and due to their small numbers. The British sending the missionaries to the north and east was for the protection of the Sinhalese and in fact, showed favouritism to the majority group instead of the minorities to maintain trading relationships and benefits from them. The Tamils, out of this random benefit from learning English and basic education excelled and flourished and were able to take many civil service jobs to the chagrin of the Sinhalese. The myth of Divide and Rule is untrue. The 'policy of standardisation' was typical of affirmative action policies, in that it required drastically lower standards for Sinhalese students than for the more academic Tamils who had to get about ten more marks to enter into universities. The policy in fact is an example of discrimination against the Tamil ethnic group.

Taiwan
A 2004 legislation requires that, for a firm with 100 employees or more wishing to compete for government contracts, at least 1 percent of its employees must be Taiwanese aborigines. Ministry of Education and Council of Aboriginal Affairs announced in 2002 that Taiwanese Aboriginal students would have their high-school or undergraduate entrance exams boosted by 33% for demonstrating some knowledge of their tribal language and culture. The percentage of boost have been revised several times, and the latest percentage is 35% in 2013.

Europe

Denmark 
Greenlanders have special advantages when applying for university, college or vocation university degrees in Denmark. With these specific rules, Greenlanders can get into degrees without the required grade averages by fulfilling certain criteria. They need to have a grade average of over 6,0 and have lived a certain number of years in Greenland. These rules have been in force since 1 January 2014.

Finland 
In certain university education programs, including legal and medical education, there are quotas for persons who reach a certain standard of skills in the Swedish language; for students admitted in these quotas, the education is partially arranged in Swedish. The purpose of the quotas is to guarantee that a sufficient number of professionals with skills in Swedish are educated for nationwide needs. The quota system has met with criticism from the Finnish speaking majority, some of whom consider the system unfair. In addition to these linguistic quotas, women may get preferential treatment in recruitment for certain public sector jobs if there is a gender imbalance in the field.

France 
No distinctions based on race, religion or sex are allowed under the 1958 French Constitution. Since the 1980s, a French version of affirmative action based on neighborhood is in place for primary and secondary education. Some schools, in neighborhoods labeled "Priority Education Zones", are granted more funds than the others. Students from these schools also benefit from special policies in certain institutions (such as Sciences Po).

The French Ministry of Defence tried in 1990 to make it easier for young French soldiers of North-African descent to be promoted in rank and obtain driving licenses. After a strong protest by a young French lieutenant in the Ministry of Defence newspaper (Armées d'aujourd'hui), the driving license and rank plan was cancelled. After the Sarkozy election, a new attempt in favour of Arab-French students was made, but Sarkozy did not gain enough political support to change the French constitution. However, some French schools do implement affirmative action in that they are obligated to take a certain number of students from impoverished families.

Additionally, following the Norwegian example, after 27 January 2014, women must represent at least 20% of board members in all stock exchange listed or state-owned companies. After 27 January 2017, the proportion will increase to 40%. All appointments of males as directors will be invalid as long as the quota is not met, and monetary penalties may apply for other directors.

Germany 
Article 3 of the German Basic Law provides for equal rights of all people regardless of sex, race or social background. There are programs stating that if men and women have equal qualifications, women have to be preferred for a job; moreover, the disabled should be preferred to non-disabled people. This is typical for all positions in state and university service , typically using the phrase "We try to increase diversity in this line of work". In recent years, there has been a long public debate about whether to issue programs that would grant women a privileged access to jobs in order to fight discrimination. Germany's Left Party brought up the discussion about affirmative action in Germany's school system. According to Stefan Zillich, quotas should be "a possibility" to help working class children who did not do well in school gain access to a Gymnasium (University-preparatory school). Headmasters of Gymnasien have objected, saying that this type of policy would "be a disservice" to poor children.

Norway 
In all public stock companies (ASA) boards, either gender should be represented by at least 40%. This affects roughly 400 companies of over 300,000 in total.

Seierstad & Opsahl in their study of the effects of affirmative action on presence, prominence, and social capital of women directors in Norway found that there are few boards chaired by a woman, from the beginning of the implementation of the affirmative action policy period to August 2009, the proportion of boards led by a woman has increased from 3.4% to 4.3%. This suggests that the law has had a marginal effect on the sex of the chair and the boards remain internally segregated. Although at the beginning of our observation period, only 7 of 91 prominent directors were women. The gender balance among prominent directors has changed considerably throughout the period, and at the end of the period, 107 women and 117 men were prominent directors. By applying more restrictive definitions of prominence, the proportion of directors who are women generally increases. If only considering directors with at least three directorships, 61.4% of them are women. When considering directors with seven or more directorships, all of them are women. Thus, affirmative action increases the female population in the director position.

A 2016 study found no effect of the ASA representation requirement on either valuation or profits of the affected companies, and also no correlation between the requirement and the restructuring of companies away from ASA.

Romania 
Romani people are allocated quotas for access to public schools and state universities.

Russia 
Quota systems existed in the USSR for various social groups including ethnic minorities (as compensation of their "cultural backwardness"), women and factory workers.

Soon after the 1918 revolution, Inessa Armand, Lenin's secretary and lover, was instrumental in creating Zhenotdel, which functioned until the 1930s as part of the international egalitarian and affirmative action movements.

Quotas for access to university education, offices in the Soviet system and the Communist Party existed: for example, the position of First Secretary of a Soviet Republic's (or Autonomous Republic's) Party Committee was always filled by a representative of this republic's "titular ethnicity".

Modern Russia retains this system partially. Quotas are abolished, but preferences for some ethnic minorities and inhabitants of certain territories remain.

Serbia 
The Constitution of the Republic of Serbia from 2006 established the principles of equality and the prohibition of discrimination on any grounds. It also promotes affirmative action "special measures" for certain marginalized groups, such as national minorities. In Serbia the Roma national minority is enabled to enroll in public schools under more favorable conditions.

Slovakia 
The Constitutional Court declared in October 2005 that affirmative action i.e. "providing advantages for people of an ethnic or racial minority group" as being against its Constitution.

United Kingdom 
The Equality Act 2010 established the principles of equality and their implementation in the UK. In the UK, any discrimination, quotas or favouritism due to sex, race and ethnicity among other "protected characteristics" is illegal by default in education, employment, during commercial transactions, in a private club or association, and while using public services, although exceptions exist, to wit: "Section 159 of the Equality Act 2010 allows an employer to treat an applicant or employee with a protected characteristic (eg race, sex or age) more favourably in connection with recruitment or promotion than someone without that characteristic who is as qualified for the role. The employer must reasonably think that people with the protected characteristic suffer a disadvantage or are under-represented in that particular activity. Taking the positive action must be a proportionate means of enabling or encouraging people to overcome the disadvantage or to take part in the activity.")

Specific exemptions include:

 Part of the Northern Ireland Peace Process, the Good Friday Agreement and the resulting Patten report required the Police Service of Northern Ireland to recruit 50% of numbers from the Catholic community and 50% from the Protestant and other communities, in order to reduce any possible bias towards Protestants. This was later referred to as the '50:50' measure. (See also Independent Commission on Policing for Northern Ireland.)
 The Sex Discrimination (Election Candidates) Act 2002 allowed the use of all-women shortlists to select more women as election candidates.

In 2019, an employment tribunal ruled that, while attempting to create a diverse force, the Cheshire Police had discriminated against a "well prepared" white heterosexual male. The ruling stated that "while positive action can be used to boost diversity, it should only be applied to distinguish between candidates who were all equally well qualified for a role".

North America

Canada 

The equality section of the Canadian Charter of Rights and Freedoms explicitly permits affirmative action type legislation, although the Charter does not require legislation that gives preferential treatment. Subsection 2 of Section 15 states that the equality provisions do "not preclude any law, program or activity that has as its object the amelioration of conditions of disadvantaged individuals or groups including those that are disadvantaged because of race, national or ethnic origin, colour, religion, sex, age or mental or physical disability".

The Canadian Employment Equity Act requires employers in federally-regulated industries to give preferential treatment to four designated groups: Women, persons with disabilities, aboriginal peoples, and visible minorities. Less than one-third of Canadian Universities offer alternative admission requirements for students of aboriginal descent. Some provinces and territories also have affirmative action-type policies. For example, in the Northwest Territories in the Canadian north, aboriginal people are given preference for jobs and education and are considered to have P1 status. Non-aboriginal people who were born in the NWT or have resided half of their life there are considered a P2, as well as women and people with disabilities.

United States

The policy of affirmative action dates to the Reconstruction Era in the United States, 1863–1877.  Current policy was introduced in the early 1960s in the United States, as a way to combat racial discrimination in the hiring process, with the concept later expanded to address gender discrimination. Affirmative action was first created from Executive Order 10925, which was signed by President John F. Kennedy on 6 March 1961 and required that government employers "not discriminate against any employee or applicant for employment because of race, creed, color, or national origin" and "take affirmative action to ensure that applicants are employed and that employees are treated during employment, without regard to their race, creed, color, or national origin".

On 24 September 1965, President Lyndon B. Johnson signed Executive Order 11246, thereby replacing Executive Order 10925 and affirming Federal Government's commitment "to promote the full realization of equal employment opportunity through a positive, continuing program in each executive department and agency". Affirmative action was extended to sex by Executive Order 11375 which amended Executive Order 11246 on 13 October 1967, by adding "sex" to the list of protected categories. In the U.S. affirmative action's original purpose was to pressure institutions into compliance with the nondiscrimination mandate of the Civil Rights Act of 1964. The Civil Rights Acts do not cover discrimination based on veteran status, disabilities, or age that is 40 years and older. These groups may be protected from discrimination under different laws.

Affirmative action has been the subject of numerous court cases, and has been questioned upon its constitutional legitimacy. In 2003, a Supreme Court decision regarding affirmative action in higher education (Grutter v. Bollinger, 539 US 244 – Supreme Court 2003) permitted educational institutions to consider race as a factor when admitting students. Alternatively, some colleges use financial criteria to attract racial groups that have typically been under-represented and typically have lower living conditions. Some states such as California (California Civil Rights Initiative), Michigan (Michigan Civil Rights Initiative), and Washington (Initiative 200) have passed constitutional amendments banning public institutions, including public schools, from practicing affirmative action within their respective states. In 2014, the U.S. Supreme Court held that "States may choose to prohibit the consideration of racial preferences in governmental decisions". By that time eight states, Oklahoma, New Hampshire, Arizona, Colorado, Nebraska, Michigan, Florida, Washington and California, had already banned affirmative action. Conservative activists have alleged that colleges quietly use illegal quotas to discriminate against people of Asian, Jewish, and Caucasian backgrounds and have launched numerous lawsuits to stop them.

Oceania

New Zealand 

Individuals of Maori or other Polynesian descent are often afforded improved access to university courses, or have scholarships earmarked specifically for them. Such access to University courses have in the past faced criticism, particularly at the University of Auckland due to a phenomenon known as Mismatch theory, accusations of setting the kids up to fail have been made due to a lack of transparency as to the preferred groups graduation rates and the university informing the students of such historical statistics dating back to the 1970s. Affirmative action is provided for under section 73 of the Human Rights Act 1993 and section 19(2) of the New Zealand Bill of Rights Act 1990.

South America

Brazil

Some Brazilian universities (state and federal) have created systems of preferred admissions (quotas) for racial minorities (blacks and Amerindians), the poor and people with disabilities. There are also quotas of up to 20% of vacancies reserved for people with disabilities in the civil public services. The Democrats party, accusing the board of directors of the University of Brasília for "resurrecting Nazist ideals", appealed to the Supreme Federal Court against the constitutionality of the quotas the university reserves for minorities. The Supreme Court unanimously approved their constitutionality on 26 April 2012.

International organizations

United Nations 
The International Convention on the Elimination of All Forms of Racial Discrimination stipulates (in Article 2.2) that affirmative action programs may be required of countries that ratified the convention, in order to rectify systematic discrimination. It states, however, that such programs "shall in no case entail as a consequence the maintenance of unequal or separate rights for different racial groups after the objectives for which they were taken have been achieved".

The United Nations Human Rights Committee states that "the principle of equality sometimes requires States parties to take affirmative action in order to diminish or eliminate conditions which cause or help to perpetuate discrimination prohibited by the Covenant. For example, in a State where the general conditions of a certain part of the population prevent or impair their enjoyment of human rights, the State should take specific action to correct those conditions. Such action may involve granting for a time to the part of the population concerned certain preferential treatment in specific matters as compared with the rest of the population. However, as long as such action is needed to correct discrimination, in fact, it is a case of legitimate differentiation under the Covenant."

Support
The principle of affirmative action is to promote societal equality through the preferential treatment of socioeconomically disadvantaged people. Often, these people are disadvantaged for historical reasons, such as oppression or slavery.
Historically and internationally, support for affirmative action has sought to achieve a range of goals: bridging inequalities in employment and pay; increasing access to education; enriching state, institutional, and professional leadership with the full spectrum of society; redressing apparent past wrongs, harms, or hindrances, in particular addressing the apparent social imbalance left in the wake of slavery and slave laws.

A 2017 study of temporary federal affirmative action regulation in the United States estimated that the regulation "increases the black share of employees over time: in 5 years after an establishment is first regulated, the black share of employees increases by an average of 0.8 percentage points. Strikingly, the black share continues to grow at a similar pace even after an establishment is deregulated. [The author] argue[s] that this persistence is driven in part by affirmative action inducing employers to improve their methods for screening potential hires."

Polls

According to a poll taken by USA Today in 2005, the majority of Americans support affirmative action for women, while views on minority groups were more split. Men are only slightly more likely to support affirmative action for women; though a majority of both do. However, a slight majority of Americans do believe that affirmative action goes beyond ensuring access and goes into the realm of preferential treatment. More recently, a Quinnipiac poll from June 2009 finds that 55% of Americans feel that affirmative action, in general, should be discontinued, though 55% support it for people with disabilities. A Gallup poll from 2005 showed that 72% of black Americans and 44% of white Americans supported racial affirmative action (with 21% and 49% opposing), with support and opposition among Hispanics falling between those of blacks and whites. Support among blacks, unlike among whites, had almost no correlation with political affiliation.

A 2009 Quinnipiac University Polling Institute survey found 65% of American voters opposed the application of affirmative action to homosexuals, with 27% indicating they supported it.

A Leger poll taken in 2010 found 59% of Canadians opposed considering race, gender, or ethnicity when hiring for government jobs.

A 2014 Pew Research Center poll found that 63% of Americans thought affirmative action programs aimed at increasing minority representation on college campuses were "a good thing", compared to 30% who thought they were "a bad thing". The following year, Gallup released a poll showing that 67% of Americans supported affirmative action programs aimed at increasing female representation, compared to 58% who supported such programs aimed at increasing the representation of racial minorities.

Criticism 

Critics of affirmative action offer a variety of arguments as to why it is counterproductive or should be discontinued. For example, critics may argue that affirmative action hinders reconciliation, replaces old wrongs with new wrongs, undermines the achievements of minorities, and encourages individuals to identify themselves as disadvantaged, even if they are not. It may increase racial tension and benefit the more privileged people within minority groups at the expense of the least fortunate within majority groups.

Some opponents of affirmative action argue that it is a form of reverse discrimination, that any effort to cure discrimination through affirmative action is wrong because it, in turn, is another form of discrimination. Some critics claim that court cases such as Fisher v. University of Texas, which held that colleges have some discretion to consider race when making admissions decisions, demonstrate how discrimination occurs in the name of affirmative action.

Some critics of affirmative action argue that affirmative action devalues the actual accomplishments of people who are chosen based on the social group to which they belong rather than their qualifications, thus rendering affirmative action counterproductive.

Some argue that affirmative action policies create an opportunity for fraud, by encouraging non-preferred groups to designate themselves as members of preferred groups (that is, members of groups that benefit from affirmative action) in order to take advantage of group preference policies.

Critics of affirmative action suggest that programs may benefit the members of the targeted group that least need the benefit, that is those who have the greatest social, economic and educational advantages within the targeted group. Other beneficiaries may be described as wholly unqualified for the opportunity made available through affirmative action. They may argue that at the same time the people who lose the most to affirmative action are the least fortunate members of non-preferred groups.

Another criticism of affirmative action is that it may reduce the incentives of both the preferred and non-preferred to perform at their best. Beneficiaries of affirmative action may conclude that it is unnecessary to work as hard, and those who do not benefit may perceive hard work as futile.

Mismatching 
Mismatching is the term given to the supposed negative effect that affirmative action has when it places a student into a college that is too difficult for them. For example, in the absence of affirmative action, a student will be admitted to a college that matches their academic ability and has a good chance of graduating. However, according to the mismatching hypothesis, affirmative action often places a student into a college that is too difficult, and this increases the student's chance of dropping out of the college or of their desired major.  Thus, affirmative action hurts its intended beneficiaries, because it increases their dropout rates. Mismatching has also been cited as a contributing factor in lowered pursuit and completion of STEM degrees among certain populations.

Evidence in support of the mismatching theory was presented by Gail Heriot, a professor of law at the University of San Diego and a member of the U.S. Commission on Civil Rights, in a 24 August 2007 article published in The Wall Street Journal. Richard Sander concluded that there were 7.9% fewer black attorneys than there would have been if there had been no affirmative action. The article also states that because of mismatching, blacks are more likely to drop out of law school and fail bar exams.

Sander's paper on mismatching has been criticized by several law professors, including Ian Ayres and Richard Brooks from Yale who argue that eliminating affirmative action would actually reduce the number of black lawyers by 12.7%. A 2008 study by Jesse Rothstein and Albert H. Yoon confirmed Sander's mismatch findings, but also found that eliminating affirmative action would "lead to a 63 percent decline in black matriculants at all law schools and a 90 percent decline at elite law schools". These high numbers predictions were doubted in a review of previous studies by Peter Arcidiacono and Michael Lovenheim. Their 2016 article found a strong indication that affirmative action results in a mismatch effect. They argued that the attendance by some African-American students to less-selective schools would significantly improve the low first attempt rate at passing the state bar, but they cautioned that such improvements could be outweighed by decreases in law school attendance.

A 2011 study proposed that mismatch can only occur when a selective school possesses private information that, had this information been disclosed, would have changed the student's choice of school. The study found that this is in fact the case for Duke University, and that this information predicts the student's academic performance after beginning college.

A 2016 study on affirmative action in India finds evidence for the mismatching hypothesis. In India 90% IIT-Roorkee dropouts are members of a backward caste.

See also

 Achievement gap in the United States
 Affirmative action bake sale
 Angry white male
 Civil and political rights
 Disability rights movement
 Diversity (business)
 Diversity training
 Economic discrimination
 Equal opportunity
 Ethnic penalty
 "Harrison Bergeron"
 Jewish quota
 Legacy preferences
 Minority rights
 Multiculturalism
 Numerus clausus
 Political correctness
 Positive liberty
 Principle-policy puzzle
 Progressive stack
 Quotaism
 Race and intelligence
 Racial quota
 Racism in the United States
 Reasonable accommodation
 Special measures for gender equality in the United Nations
 Strong-basis-in-evidence standard
 Social justice
 Tokenism
 White guilt
 Women's rights
 Substantive equality

References

Further reading
  Pdf.
 
 
 Bernstein, David E. (2022) Classified: The untold story of racial classification in America. Bombardier Books, NY. ISBN 1637581734.
 
 
  E/CN.4/Sub.2/2002/21 Pdf.
 
  Forewords by: Mary Sue Coleman, President of the University of Michigan and Njabulo Ndebele, Former Vice-Chancellor and Principal of the University of Cape Town. Details.
 
  Order No. DA3325474.
 
  Pdf.
 Heriot, Gail & Somin, Alison, Affirmative Action for Men?:  Strange Silence and Strange Bedfellows in the Public Debate Over Discrimination Against Women in College Admissions, Engage (November 2011).
Stohler, Stephan (2021). "Untangling the Partisan Roots of Affirmative Action". Polity. 53 (1): 41–74.
 
  Der Tagesspiegel

External links

 
 
 Affirmative Action collected news and commentary at The Washington Post
 Does the success of Barack Obama mean we no longer need affirmative action? NOW on PBS investigates
 An interview with Professor Randall Kennedy about the presidency of Barack Obama and affirmative action Clifford Armion for La Clé des langues.
 Substantive Equality, Positive Action and Roma Rights in the European Union, Report by Minority Rights Group International
 Intelligence Squared debate: Affirmative Action on Campus Does More Harm than Good 

 
Discrimination
Race and law
Liberalism
Left-wing politics
Majority–minority relations
Industrial and organizational psychology